The men's 60 metres hurdles at the 2018 IAAF World Indoor Championships took place on 3 and 4 March 2018.

Summary
Andrew Pozzi led both qualifying rounds to prove he was a leading contender.  Four the third championship in a row, France put two athletes into the final, one of them was returning silver medalist Pascal Martinot-Lagarde in his fourth straight final.  Outdoor world record holder Aries Merritt also made the final, though expectations for him are not as lofty since his kidney transplant.

After setting his national record as the #2 qualifier in the semi-finals, Milan Trajkovic false started himself out of the finals.  Pozzi was the first over the first hurdle, but only inches ahead of Jarret Eaton.  Between hurdles, Eaton exploded to almost a foot (30 cm) advantage over the next hurdle, about the same advantage Pozzi held over Martinot-Lagarde.  Both Pozzi and Martinot-Lagarde rattled the second hurdle, though Martinot-Lagarde lost more ground being knocked off balance.  Eaton extended his lead, doubling it over the third hurdle, which he rattled.  Martinot-Lagarde slammed the third hurdle and was out of contention, replaced by his teammate Aurel Manga and Merritt another two feet behind Pozzi.  Going over the fourth hurdle, Merritt looked to have a slight advantage over Manga but by the final barrier Manga had the advantage.  Eaton slammed the final hurdle, losing some of his momentum, Pozzi caught him before the finish.  Manga clearly beat Merritt to the line for bronze.

Results

Heats
The heats were started on 3 March at 18:30.

Semifinal
The semifinals were started on 4 March at 15:05.

Final

The final was started on March 4 at 17:00.

References

60 metres
60 metres hurdles at the World Athletics Indoor Championships
2018 in men's athletics